The Ura, also known as Kamenka and Uksakan, is a river in Yakutia (Sakha Republic), Russia.

The river flows across an uninhabited area of the Olyokminsky District.

Course  
The Ura is a left tributary of the Lena. It has its sources in the Lena Plateau, to the southeast of the course of the Ergedey, the main tributary of the Derba. The river heads in a roughly southwestern direction across taiga wooded areas with scattered lakes.

The mouth of the Ura, having a picturesque knoll rising above it, is a tourist attraction regularly visited by river cruisers Demyan Bedny and Mikhail Svetlov. The Ura freezes yearly between October and May.

Fauna
Pike, burbot and sander are found in the waters of the Ura.

See also
List of rivers of Russia

References

External links 

Fishing & Tourism in Yakutia

Central Siberian Plateau
Rivers of the Sakha Republic